Musongati Gitega Football Club, also known as Musongati Football Club, is a football club based in Gitega, Burundi. The club currently plays in the first division, Burundi Ligue A.

Squad

Honours

Domestic competitions 
Ligue A Runners-up (1):2019/2020

FA Cup
Champions (1): 2020

See also

CAF Competition 
CAF (1):2020
Preliminary Round: Green Eagles (Zambia)
Home: Musongati 2-2 Green Eagles
Away: Green Eagles 2-1 Musongati

References

External links 
 

Football clubs in Burundi
Association football clubs established in 1982